Mária Róka (15 September 1940 – 28 September 2021) was a Hungarian sprint canoer who competed in the mid-1960s. At the 1964 Summer Olympics in Tokyo, she finished seventh in the K-2 500 m event and eighth in the K-1 500 m event.

References

Sports-reference.com profile

1940 births
2021 deaths
Canoeists at the 1964 Summer Olympics
Hungarian female canoeists
Olympic canoeists of Hungary